2014–15 Deodhar Trophy was the 42nd season of the Deodhar Trophy, a List A cricket tournament contested by the five zonal teams of India: Central Zone, East Zone, North Zone, South Zone and West Zone. The tournament consisted of four matches, all of which were hosted by the Wankhede Stadium in Mumbai.

East Zone won the tournament after beating the defending champions West Zone in the final by 24 runs.

Schedule
The 2014–15 Deodhar Trophy consisted of four matches played between the teams, where the two teams that performed the worst in the 2013–14 season of the Deodhar Trophy, Central Zone and South Zone, had to play each other in an additional knockout game to progress to the semifinals.

The schedule:
 29 November - Quarterfinal - Central Zone vs South Zone
 30 November - Semifinal1 - East Zone vs North Zone
 1 December - Semifinal2 - West Zone vs Winner Quarterfinal
 2 December - Final - Winner Semifinal1 vs Winner Semifinal2

Squads

Results

Quarterfinal

Semifinal 1

Semifinal 2

Final

References

External links
Cricinfo page

Deodhar Trophy
Deodhar Trophy
Deodhar Trophy